Microcentrum retinerve is a species in the family Tettigoniidae ("katydids"), in the order Orthoptera ("grasshoppers, crickets, katydids"). A common name for Microcentrum retinerve is "lesser angle-winged katydid".
Microcentrum retinerve is found in North America.

References

Further reading
 
 Field Guide To Grasshoppers, Katydids, And Crickets Of The United States, Capinera, Scott, Walker. 2004. Cornell University Press.
 Otte, Daniel (1997). Tettigonioidea. Orthoptera Species File 7, 373.

Phaneropterinae
Insects described in 1838